The Czech Sailing Association is the national governing body for the sport of sailing in Czech Republic, recognised by the International Sailing Federation.

History
Founded in 1929 as the Czechoslovak Yachting Association and known since 1993 as Czech Sailing Association.

Notable sailors
See :Category:Czech sailors

Olympic sailing
See :Category:Olympic sailors of the Czech Republic

Offshore sailing
See :Category:Czech sailors (sport)

References

External links
 Official website

Czech Republic
Sailing
1929 establishments in Czechoslovakia
1993 establishments in the Czech Republic